Abdullah Al-Nibari (22 March 1936 – 20 March 2022) was a Kuwaiti politician. A member of the Kuwait Democratic Forum, he served in the National Assembly from 1971 to 1976 and again from 1992 to 1999. He died in Kuwait City on 20 March 2022 at the age of 85.

References

1936 births
2022 deaths
Kuwaiti politicians
Members of the National Assembly (Kuwait)
The American University in Cairo alumni
Alumni of the University of Oxford
People from Kuwait City